Iron Man 2 is a 2010 American superhero film based on the Marvel Comics character Iron Man. Produced by Marvel Studios and distributed by Paramount Pictures, it is the sequel to Iron Man (2008) and the third film in the Marvel Cinematic Universe (MCU). Directed by Jon Favreau and written by Justin Theroux, the film stars Robert Downey Jr. as Tony Stark / Iron Man alongside Gwyneth Paltrow, Don Cheadle, Scarlett Johansson, Sam Rockwell, Mickey Rourke, and Samuel L. Jackson. Six months after Iron Man, Tony Stark resists calls from the United States government to hand over the Iron Man technology, which is causing his declining health. Meanwhile, Russian scientist Ivan Vanko (Rourke) uses his own version of the technology to pursue a vendetta against the Stark family.

Following the critical and commercial success of Iron Man in May 2008, Marvel Studios announced and immediately set to work on producing a sequel. In July, Theroux was hired to write the script and Favreau was signed to return as director. Downey, Paltrow, and Jackson were set to reprise their roles from Iron Man, while Cheadle was brought in to replace Terrence Howard in the role of James Rhodes. In the early months of 2009, Rourke (Vanko), Rockwell, and Johansson filled out the supporting cast. Filming took place from April to July 2009, mostly in California as in the first film, except for a key sequence in Monaco. Unlike its predecessor, which mixed digital and practical effects, the sequel primarily relied on computer-generated imagery to create the Iron Man suits.

Iron Man 2 premiered at the El Capitan Theatre on April 26, 2010, and was released in the United States on May 7, as part of Phase One of the MCU. The film received praise for its action sequences and performances, although critics deemed it to be inferior to the first film. The sequel grossed over $623.9 million at the worldwide box office, making it the seventh-highest-grossing film of 2010. It received an Academy Award nomination for Best Visual Effects. A sequel, Iron Man 3, was released on May 3, 2013.

Plot 
In Russia, the media covers Tony Stark's disclosure of his identity as Iron Man. Ivan Vanko, whose father Anton Vanko—a former Stark Industries employee—has just died, sees this and begins building a miniature arc reactor similar to Stark.

Six months later, Stark has become a media superstar and resists pressure to turn over his armored suits to the government. To continue the legacy of his father Howard, he re-institutes the Stark Expo in New York City's Flushing Meadows–Corona Park. Stark learns that the palladium core in the arc reactor that keeps him alive and powers the armor is slowly poisoning him, and he cannot find a substitute. Growing increasingly reckless and despondent about his impending death, and choosing not to tell anyone about his condition, Stark appoints his assistant Pepper Potts as CEO of Stark Industries and hires Stark employee Natalie Rushman to replace her as his assistant.

Stark competes in the Monaco Historic Grand Prix, where he is attacked in the middle of the race by Vanko, who wields electrified whips powered by his arc reactor. Stark dons his armor and defeats Vanko, but the suit is severely damaged. Vanko explains that he intended to prove to the world that Iron Man is not invincible. Impressed by Vanko's performance, Stark's rival, Justin Hammer, fakes Vanko's death while breaking him out of prison and asks him to build a line of armored suits to upstage Stark, though Vanko decides that unmanned drones are a better idea. During what he believes is his final birthday party, Stark gets drunk while wearing the Iron Man suit.

Disgusted, Stark's best friend, U.S. Air Force Lieutenant Colonel James Rhodes, dons Stark's prototype armor and tries to restrain him. The fight ends in a stalemate, and Rhodes confiscates the armor for the U.S. Air Force. Nick Fury, director of S.H.I.E.L.D., approaches Stark, revealing that "Rushman" is agent Natasha Romanoff and that Howard Stark was the S.H.I.E.L.D. founder whom Fury knew personally. Fury explains that Vanko's father and Stark invented the arc reactor together, but when Anton tried to sell it, Stark had him deported. The Soviets sent Anton to the Gulag.

Fury gives Stark some of his father's old material. Tony discovers a hidden message in the diorama of the 1974 Stark Expo; it proves to be a diagram of the atomic structure of a new element. With the aid of his A.I., J.A.R.V.I.S., Stark synthesizes it. When he learns that Vanko is still alive, he places the new element in his arc reactor and ends his palladium dependency. At the current Expo, Hammer unveils Vanko's armored drones, led by Rhodes in a heavily weaponized version of the prototype armor, dubbed "War Machine". Stark arrives to warn Rhodes, but Vanko takes remote control of all the drones and Rhodes' armor and attacks Stark. Hammer soon gets arrested for breaking Vanko out of prison, while Romanoff and Stark's bodyguard Happy Hogan go after Vanko at Hammer's factory.

Vanko escapes, but Romanoff returns control of Rhodes' armor to him. Together, Stark and Rhodes defeat Vanko and his drones. Vanko commits suicide by blowing up his suit, along with the defeated drones. At a debriefing, Fury informs Stark that because of his difficult personality, S.H.I.E.L.D. intends to use him only as a consultant. Stark and Rhodes receive medals for their heroism. In a post-credits scene, S.H.I.E.L.D. agent Phil Coulson reports the discovery of a large hammer at the bottom of a crater in a desert in New Mexico.

Cast 

 Robert Downey Jr. as Tony Stark / Iron Man: A billionaire who escaped captivity in Afghanistan with a suit of armor he created, he now struggles to keep his technology out of the government's hands. Downey and Favreau, who had been handed a script and worked from it on the first movie, conceived part of the film's story themselves. On Stark being a hero, Downey said, "It's kind of heroic, but really kind of on his own behalf. So I think there's probably a bit of an imposter complex and no sooner has he said, 'I am Iron Man–' that he's now really wondering what that means. If you have all this cushion like he does and the public is on your side and you have immense wealth and power, I think he's way too insulated to be okay." Downey put on 20 pounds of muscle to reprise the role. Six-year-old Davin Ransom portrays Tony Stark as a child.
 Gwyneth Paltrow as Pepper Potts: Stark's closest friend, budding love interest, and business partner; Pepper is promoted to CEO of Stark Industries. On her character's promotion, Paltrow opined, "When we start Iron Man 2 Pepper and Tony are very much in the same vibe... as the movie progresses, Pepper is given more responsibility and she's promoted and it's nice to see her sort of grow up in that way. I think it really suits her, the job fits her really well." Paltrow expressed excitement about working with Johansson.
 Don Cheadle as James "Rhodey" Rhodes / War Machine: An officer in the U.S. Air Force and Tony Stark's close personal friend who later operates the War Machine armor. Cheadle replaces Terrence Howard from the first film. Cheadle had only a few hours to accept the role and did not even know what storyline Rhodes would undergo. He commented that he is a comic book fan, but had not previously participated in comics-themed films due to the scarcity of black superheroes. Cheadle said he thought Iron Man was a robot before the first film came out. On how he approached his character, Cheadle stated, "I go, what's the common denominator here? And the common denominator was really his friendship with Tony, and that's what we really tried to track in this one. How is their friendship impacted once Tony comes out and owns 'I am Iron Man'?". Cheadle signed a six-picture deal.
 Scarlett Johansson as Natasha Romanoff / Black Widow: An undercover spy for S.H.I.E.L.D. posing as Stark's new assistant. Johansson dyed her hair red before she landed the part, hoping that it would help convince Favreau that she was right for the role. On why she chose the role, Johansson said, "the Black Widow character resonated with me... [She] is a superhero, but she's also human. She's small, but she's strong... She is dark and has faced death so many times that she has a deep perspective on the value of life... It's hard not to admire her." She stated that she had "a bit of a freak-out moment" when she first saw the cat-suit and worked closely with the stunt team to learn how to fight in it in order to "sell it". During promotion for Black Widow (2021), Johansson said the character was hyper-sexualized in Iron Man 2, specifically referring to dialogue that described her as "a piece of something, like a possession", but at the time she felt this was "like a compliment". Though she was grateful to have been a part of the film, she was more grateful that the character's portrayal had evolved to convey a more positive message by the time of Black Widow.
 Sam Rockwell as Justin Hammer: A rival weapons manufacturer. Sam Rockwell was considered for the role of Tony Stark in the first film, and he accepted the role of Hammer without reading the script. He had never heard of the character before he was contacted about the part, and was unaware Hammer is an old Englishman in the comics. Rockwell said, "I worked with Jon Favreau on this film called Made. And Justin Theroux, who wrote the script, is an old friend of mine, they sort of cooked up this idea and pitched it to Kevin Feige. What they did, they were maybe going to do one villain like they did with Jeff Bridges, but then they decided to split the villains. And really Mickey [Rourke] is the main [villain], but I come to his aid." Rockwell described his character as "plucky comic relief, but he's got a little bit of an edge".
 Mickey Rourke as Ivan Vanko / Whiplash: A Russian physicist and ex-convict who builds a pair of arc reactor-based electric whips to exact vengeance on the Stark family. The character is an amalgamation of Whiplash and Crimson Dynamo. Rourke visited Butyrka prison to research the role, and he suggested that half of the character's dialogue be in Russian. He also suggested the addition of tattoos, gold teeth and a fondness for a pet cockatoo, paying for the teeth and bird with his own money. Rourke explained that he did not want to play a "one-dimensional bad guy", and wanted to challenge the audience to see something redeemable in him. Not knowing anything about computers, Rourke described pretending to be tech-savvy as the hardest part of the role.
 Samuel L. Jackson as Nick Fury: Director of S.H.I.E.L.D.; Jackson signed a nine-film contract to play the character. On the subject of his character not seeing any action in the film, Jackson said, "We still haven't moved Nick Fury into the bad-ass zone. He's still just kind of a talker."

The director, Jon Favreau, reprises his role as Happy Hogan, Tony Stark's bodyguard and chauffeur, while Clark Gregg and Leslie Bibb reprise their roles as S.H.I.E.L.D. agent Phil Coulson and reporter Christine Everhart, respectively. John Slattery appears as Tony's father Howard Stark and Garry Shandling appears as United States Senator Stern, who wants Stark to give Iron Man's armor to the government. Favreau stated that Shandling's character was named after radio personality Howard Stern. Paul Bettany again voices Stark's computer, J.A.R.V.I.S. Olivia Munn originally appeared as an unnamed character who was subsequently cut from the film. Favreau then gave her the role of Chess Roberts, a reporter covering the Stark expo. Yevgeni Lazarev appears as Ivan Vanko's father, Anton Vanko, Kate Mara portrays a process server who summons Tony to the government hearing, and Stan Lee appears as himself (but is mistaken for Larry King).

Additionally, news anchor Christiane Amanpour, political commentator Bill O'Reilly, Tesla Motors CEO Elon Musk, and Oracle Corporation CEO Larry Ellison appear as themselves. Adam Goldstein also appears as himself, and the film is dedicated to his memory. Favreau's son Max appears as a child wearing an Iron Man mask whom Stark saves from a drone. In 2017, Spider-Man: Homecoming director Jon Watts said that he had suggested to Feige that they retroactively establish this child to be the introduction of a young Peter Parker / Spider-Man to the MCU, an idea that Feige agreed was plausible, and which Spider-Man actor Tom Holland also supported.

Production

Development 

Jon Favreau said it was originally his intent to create a film trilogy for Iron Man, with Obadiah Stane (Jeff Bridges) becoming Iron Monger during the sequels. After a meeting between Favreau and various comic book writers, including Mark Millar, Stane became the main villain in Iron Man. Millar argued that the Mandarin, whom Favreau originally intended to fill that role, was too fantastical. Favreau concurred, deciding, "I look at Mandarin more like how in Star Wars you had the Emperor, but Darth Vader is the guy you want to see fight. Then you work your way to the time when lightning bolts are shooting out of the fingers and all that stuff could happen. But you can't have what happened in Return of the Jedi happen in A New Hope. You just can't do it." Favreau also discussed in interviews how the films' version of Mandarin "allows us to incorporate the whole pantheon of villains". He mentioned that S.H.I.E.L.D. would continue to have a major role.

During development, Favreau said the film would explore Stark's alcoholism, but it would not be "the 'Demon in a Bottle' version". While promoting the first film, Downey stated that Stark would probably develop a drinking problem as he is unable to cope with his age, the effects of revealing he is Iron Man, and Pepper getting a boyfriend. Downey later clarified that the film was not a strict adaptation of the "Demon in a Bottle" storyline from the comic book series, but was instead about the "interim space" between the origin and the "Demon" story arc. Shane Black gave some advice on the script, and suggested to Favreau and Downey that they model Stark on J. Robert Oppenheimer, who became depressed with being "the destroyer of worlds" after working on the Manhattan Project. An early version for the film's story involved Justin Hammer creating different villains in addition to Whiplash, like Ghost, but the idea was discarded. Ghost debuted in the MCU years later in Ant-Man and the Wasp.

Pre-production 
Immediately following Iron Mans release, Marvel Studios announced that they were developing a sequel, with an intended release date of April 30, 2010. In July 2008, after several months of negotiating, Favreau officially signed on to direct. That same month, Justin Theroux signed to write the script, which would be based on a story written by Favreau and Downey. Theroux co-wrote Tropic Thunder, which Downey had starred in, and Downey recommended him to Marvel. Genndy Tartakovsky storyboarded the film, and Adi Granov returned to supervise the designs for Iron Man's armor.

In October 2008, Marvel Studios came to an agreement to film Iron Man 2, as well as their next three films, at Raleigh Studios in Manhattan Beach, California. A few days later, Don Cheadle was hired to replace Terrence Howard. On being replaced, Howard stated, "There was no explanation, apparently the contracts that we write and sign aren't worth the paper that they're printed on sometimes. Promises aren't kept, and good-faith negotiations aren't always held up." Entertainment Weekly stated Favreau did not enjoy working with Howard, often re-shooting and cutting his scenes; Howard's publicist said he had a good experience playing the part, while Marvel chose not to comment. As Favreau and Theroux chose to reduce the role, Marvel came to Howard to discuss lowering his salary—Howard was the first actor hired in Iron Man and was paid the largest salary. The publication stated they were unsure whether Howard's representatives left the project first or if Marvel chose to stop negotiating. Theroux denied the part of the report which claimed the size of the role had fluctuated. In November 2013, Howard stated that, going into the film, the studio offered him far less than was in his three-picture contract, claiming they told him the second will be successful, "with or without you," and, without mentioning him by name, said Downey "took the money that was supposed to go to me and pushed me out."

In January 2009, Rourke and Rockwell entered negotiations to play a pair of villains. A few days later, Rockwell confirmed he would take the role, and that his character would be Justin Hammer. Paul Bettany confirmed that he would be returning to voice J.A.R.V.I.S. Marvel entered into early talks with Emily Blunt to play the Black Widow, though she was unable to take the role due to a previous commitment to star in Gulliver's Travels. Samuel L. Jackson confirmed that he had been in discussions to reprise the role of Nick Fury from the first film's post-credits scene, but that contract disputes were making a deal difficult. Jackson stated, "There was a huge kind of negotiation that broke down. I don't know. Maybe I won't be Nick Fury."

In February, Jackson and Marvel came to terms, and he was signed to play the character in up to nine films. Downey and Rourke discussed his part during a roundtable discussion with David Ansen at the 2009 Golden Globes, and Rourke met with Favreau and Theroux to discuss the role. Rourke almost dropped out because of Marvel's initial salary offer of $250,000, but the studio raised the offer, and in March, Rourke signed on. Later that same day, Scarlett Johansson signed on to play the Black Widow. Her deal included options for multiple films, including potentially The Avengers. Prior to her casting, Johansson had also researched other Marvel characters she could play, including the Blonde Phantom and the Wasp. In April, Garry Shandling, Clark Gregg, and Kate Mara joined the cast.

Filming 

Principal photography began April 6, 2009, at the Pasadena Masonic Temple, with the working title Rasputin. The bulk of the production took place at Raleigh Studios, though other locations were also used. Scenes were filmed at Edwards Air Force Base from May 11 through May 13. The location had also been used for Iron Man, and Favreau stated that he felt the "real military assets make the movie more authentic and the topography and the beauty of the desert and flightline open the movie up". The Historic Grand Prix of Monaco action sequence was shot in the parking lot of Downey Studios, with sets constructed in May and filming lasting through June. Permission to film in Monaco prior to the 2009 Monaco Grand Prix had initially been awarded, but was later retracted by Bernie Ecclestone. The filmmakers shipped one Rolls-Royce Phantom there and filmed a track sequence in which race cars were later digitally added. Tanner Foust took on the role of driving Stark's racing car. Also in June, it was reported that John Slattery had joined the film's cast as Howard Stark. Olivia Munn was also cast, in an unspecified role.

A massive green screen was constructed at the Sepulveda Dam to film a portion of the Stark Expo exterior, with the rest either shot at an area high school or added digitally. To construct the green screen, hundreds of shipping containers were stacked, covered in plywood and plaster, and then painted green. For the conclusion of that climactic scene, which the crew dubbed the "Japanese Garden" scene, a set was built inside Sony Studios in Los Angeles. Filming lasted 71 days, and the film's production officially wrapped on July 18, 2009. A post-credits scene depicting the discovery of a large hammer was filmed on the set of Thor, and some of it was reused in the film. Jon Favreau revealed that the scene was filmed with anamorphic lenses to match Thor, and was directed by Kenneth Branagh, the director of Thor.

Post-production 
In January 2010, IMAX Corporation, Marvel, and Paramount announced that the film would receive a limited release on digital IMAX screens. It was not shot with IMAX cameras, so it was converted into the format using the IMAX DMR technology. The film underwent reshoots in February. Olivia Munn's original role was cut, but she was given a new role during the reshoots.

Janek Sirrs was the film's visual effects supervisor, and Industrial Light & Magic did the majority of the effects, as it did on the first film. ILM's visual effects supervisor on the film, Ben Snow, said their work on the film was "harder" than their work on the first, stating that Favreau asked more of them this time around. Snow described the process of digitally creating the suits:

ILM created 527 shots for the film, using programs such as Maya. Perception worked on over 125 shots for the film. They crafted gadgets, such as Tony Stark's transparent LG smartphone, and created the backdrops for the Stark Expo as well as the computer screen interfaces on the touch-screen coffee table and the holographic lab environment. In total, 11 visual effect studios worked on the film.

Music 

A soundtrack album featuring AC/DC was released by Columbia Records on April 19, 2010, in at least three different versions: basic, special and deluxe. The basic edition includes the CD; the special edition contains a 15-track CD, a 32-page booklet and a DVD featuring interviews, behind-the-scenes footage, and music videos; and the deluxe includes a reproduction of one of Iron Man's first comic book appearances. Only 2 songs on the soundtrack actually appear in the movie. Although not included on the soundtrack album the film includes songs by The Average White Band, The Clash, Queen, Daft Punk, 2Pac and Beastie Boys.

The film score was released commercially as Iron Man 2: Original Motion Picture Score on July 20, 2010, featuring 25 tracks. John Debney composed the score with Tom Morello, with composer Richard M. Sherman of the Sherman Brothers contributing the Stark Expo theme song, "Make Way for Tomorrow Today".

Marketing 

At the 2009 San Diego Comic Con, a five-minute trailer for the movie was shown. Actors portraying Stark Industries recruiters handed out business cards with an invitation to apply. A website for Stark Industries went online, with an attached graphic of a "napkin memo" from Stark to Potts announcing that Stark Industries no longer made weapons. Another section featured an online application. It was confirmed that the first theatrical trailer would premiere in front of Sherlock Holmes (another Robert Downey Jr. film). This trailer was released online on December 16, 2009. A new trailer was shown by Robert Downey Jr. on Jimmy Kimmel Live! on March 7 after the Academy Awards. Promotional partners included Symantec, Dr Pepper, Burger King, 7 Eleven, Audi, LG Electronics and Hershey.

Author Alexander C. Irvine adapted the script into a novel, also titled Iron Man 2, that was released in April 2010. Prior to the film release, Marvel Comics released a four-issue miniseries comic book titled Iron Man vs Whiplash, which introduced the film's version of Whiplash into the Marvel Universe. A three-issue prequel miniseries titled Iron Man 2: Public Identity was released in April.

An Iron Man 2 video game was released by Sega on May 4, 2010, in North America, written by The Invincible Iron Man scribe Matt Fraction. The Wii version was developed by High Voltage Software and all console versions were published by Sega, while Gameloft published the mobile game. The game's Comic-Con trailer showed that the Crimson Dynamo was set to appear as a villain. Cheadle and Jackson voice their respective characters in the games. The trailer revealed that A.I.M, Roxxon Energy Corporation, and Ultimo (depicted as a man named Kearson DeWitt in a large armor suit) are enemies in the game as well as revealing that the wearer of the Crimson Dynamo armor is General Valentin Shatalov. The game received "generally unfavorable" reviews, with a Metacritic score of 41% for both the PS3 and Xbox 360 versions.

Release

Theatrical 
Iron Man 2 premiered at the El Capitan Theatre in Los Angeles, California, on April 26, 2010, and was released in 6,764 theaters (48 IMAX) across 54 countries between April 28 and May 7, before going into general release in the United States on May 7, 2010. In the United States, it opened at 4,380 theaters, 181 of which were IMAX. The international release date of the film was moved forward to increase interest ahead of the 2010 FIFA World Cup association football tournament. Iron Man 2 is part of Phase One of the MCU.

Home media 
On September 28, 2010, the film was released by Paramount Home Entertainment on DVD and Blu-ray. The film was also collected in a 10-disc box set titled "Marvel Cinematic Universe: Phase One – Avengers Assembled", which includes all of the Phase One films in the Marvel Cinematic Universe. It was released by Walt Disney Studios Home Entertainment on April 2, 2013.

Reception

Box office 
Iron Man 2 earned $312.4 million in the United States and Canada, as well as $311.5 million in other territories, for a worldwide total of $623.9 million. Since the film was included in a predetermined legacy distribution deal that was signed before The Walt Disney Company purchased Marvel, Paramount Pictures distributed the film and collected 8% of the box office, while the remaining portion went to Disney.

Iron Man 2 earned $51 million on its opening day in the United States and Canada (including $7.5 million from Thursday previews), for a total weekend gross of $128 million, which was the fifth-highest opening weekend ever, at the time, behind The Dark Knight, Spider-Man 3, The Twilight Saga: New Moon, and Pirates of the Caribbean: Dead Man's Chest. It also had the highest opening for a 2010 movie and Paramount's highest opening weekend. The film yielded an average of $29,252 per theater. IMAX contributed $9.8 million, which was the highest opening weekend for a 2D IMAX film, surpassing Star Trek's previous record of $8.5 million. Iron Man 2 is the thrid-highest-grossing film of 2010 in the United States and Canada, behind Toy Story 3 and Alice in Wonderland.

Iron Man 2 launched in six European markets with number-one openings on Wednesday, April 28, 2010, for a total of $2.2 million. It earned $100.2 million its first five days from 53 foreign markets, for a strong average of $14,814 per site. IMAX Corporation reported grosses of $2.25 million, surpassing the previous record-holder for an IMAX 2D release, 2009's Transformers: Revenge of the Fallen ($2.1 million). It was the seventh-highest-grossing film of 2010 internationally, behind Toy Story 3, Alice in Wonderland, Harry Potter and the Deathly Hallows – Part 1, Inception, Shrek Forever After, and The Twilight Saga: Eclipse.

Critical response 

The website's critical consensus reads, "It isn't quite the breath of fresh air that Iron Man was, but this sequel comes close with solid performances and an action-packed plot." Metacritic gave the film a weighted average rating of 57 out of 100, based on 40 critics, indicating "mixed or average reviews". Audiences polled by CinemaScore gave the film an average grade of "A" on a scale of A+ to F, the same score as its predecessor.

Brian Lowry of Variety stated, "Iron Man 2 isn't as much fun as its predecessor, but by the time the smoke clears, it'll do". Anthony Lane of The New Yorker said, "To find a comic-book hero who doesn't agonize over his supergifts, and would defend his constitutional right to get a kick out of them, is frankly a relief". David Edelstein of New York Magazine wrote, "It doesn't come close to the emotional heft of those two rare 2s that outclassed their ones: Superman II and Spider-Man 2. But Iron Man 2 hums along quite nicely". Roger Ebert gave it 3 stars out of 4, stating, "Iron Man 2 is a polished, high-octane sequel, not as good as the original but building once again on a quirky performance by Robert Downey Jr". Frank Lovece of Film Journal International, a one-time Marvel Comics writer, said, "In a refreshing and unexpected turn, the sequel to Iron Man doesn't find a changed man. Inside the metal, imperfect humanity grows even more so, as thought-provoking questions of identity meet techno-fantasy made flesh."

Conversely, Kirk Honeycutt of The Hollywood Reporter stated, "Everything fun and terrific about Iron Man, a mere two years ago, has vanished with its sequel. In its place, Iron Man 2 has substituted noise, confusion, multiple villains, irrelevant stunts and misguided story lines."

Accolades

Sequel 

After the release of Iron Man 2, Walt Disney Studios agreed to pay Paramount at least $115 million for the worldwide distribution rights to Iron Man 3 and The Avengers. Disney, Marvel, and Paramount announced a May 3, 2013, release date for Iron Man 3. Shane Black directed Iron Man 3, from a screenplay by Drew Pearce. Downey, Paltrow, Cheadle, and Favreau reprised their roles, while Ben Kingsley played Trevor Slattery, Guy Pearce played Aldrich Killian, and Rebecca Hall played Maya Hansen.

See also 
 List of films featuring powered exoskeletons
 "What If... the World Lost Its Mightiest Heroes?", an episode of the MCU television series What If...? that reimagines some events of this film

Notes

References

External links 

 
 
 
 Stark Expo viral marketing website (archived)

2010 science fiction action films
2010 science fiction films
2010s adventure films
2010s American films
2010s English-language films
2010s superhero films
American films about revenge
American science fiction action films
American science fiction adventure films
American sequel films
Drone films
Films about technological impact
Films directed by Jon Favreau
Films scored by John Debney
Films set in California
Films set in Los Angeles
Films set in Monaco
Films set in New Mexico
Films set in Queens, New York
Films shot in California
Films shot in Los Angeles
Films with screenplays by Justin Theroux
IMAX films
Iron Man (film series)
Marvel Cinematic Universe: Phase One films
Paramount Pictures films